The Melvin W. and Mary Perry House is a historic house located at 519 Third Street in Algoma, Wisconsin. It is historically significant for its association with the life of Melvin W. Perry.

Description and history
The Shingle Style house was built for M. W. Perry, who was Mayor of Algoma and a member of the Wisconsin State Senate. He lived in it from the time of its completion until his death in 1951. It was added to the National Register of Historic Places on January 23, 2008.

References

Houses in Kewaunee County, Wisconsin
Colonial Revival architecture in Wisconsin
Houses on the National Register of Historic Places in Wisconsin
Shingle Style architecture in Wisconsin
National Register of Historic Places in Kewaunee County, Wisconsin
Shingle Style houses
Houses completed in 1909